Jesse Lee Soffer (born April 23, 1984) is an American actor and television director. He is known for portraying Will Munson on the CBS soap opera As the World Turns, and received three Emmy nominations for his work on the show. From 2014 to 2022, he starred as Jay Halstead on the NBC drama Chicago P.D. and guest-starred on Chicago P.D. crossover episodes with Chicago Med and Chicago Fire, as part of the main cast. He is also known for his role as Bobby Brady in the comedy The Brady Bunch Movie and its sequel A Very Brady Sequel.

Early life and education
Jesse Lee Soffer was born on April 23, 1984, in Ossining, New York to Jill Hindes (née Bruning) and Stan Soffer. His father died in 1993, when he was nine-years-old. Soffer has two younger half-sisters, Shayne and Jenna Hindes, from his mother's second marriage. He also has two older half-siblings from his father's first marriage, Craig and Melisa Soffer. Soffer spent part of his childhood in Tarrytown, New York, and later moved to Newtown, Connecticut, at age 10.

Soffer boarded at The Gunnery, graduating in 2003. He played soccer in school and was named in the all-star team (prep school category) during his senior season. He took classes at New York University (NYU).

Career
Soffer's acting career began at age 6 when he landed a Kix cereal commercial. In 1993 at age of eight, he made his feature film debut with John Goodman and Cathy Moriarty in the comedy Matinee.

In 1994, Soffer co-starred as Percival in the drama Safe Passage. In 1995, Soffer co-starred as Bobby Brady in the comedy The Brady Bunch Movie and reprised his role in A Very Brady Sequel a year later. Continuing the pattern of working with Oscar-calibre and A-list talent, Soffer starred as a runaway-turned-sleuth Jamie Kincaid in the TV movie From the Mixed-Up Files of Mrs. Basil E. Frankweiler. He worked with director Richard Shepard in the AMC TV movie The Royale. In 1998, Soffer was cast as Taylor Donovan with Mary-Kate and Ashley Olsen on the ABC sitcom Two of a Kind. He also originated the role of Max Nickerson on the CBS soap opera Guiding Light in 1999.
After four months on the show, he left to focus on his studies.

After graduating from high school, Soffer returned to his television career. In 2004, he took over the role of troubled youth Will Munson on the CBS soap opera As the World Turns. He played the role until April 4, 2008. As of 2008, he was nominated three times for the Daytime Emmy Award for Outstanding Younger Actor in a Drama Series for his work on ATWT as well as a Soap Opera Digest Award nomination for Outstanding Younger Lead Actor in 2005. In 2007, Soffer returned to his film career and co-starred with Carly Schroeder in Davis Guggenheim's sports drama Gracie, based on a true story. In July 2010, Soffer reprised his role as Will Munsen on As the World Turns. During his time on As the World Turns, he was cast in an episode of Dick Wolf's Law & Order: SVU. However, he was unable to film due to a clash in filming commitments. In 2011, Soffer co-starred in the dystopian science fiction action thriller In Time.

Since then, he has guest-starred on a number of television series including CSI: Miami, The Mentalist and Rizzoli & Isles. In 2012, he co-starred with Jordana Spiro in the short-lived Fox medical drama The Mob Doctor as Nate Devlin, the streetwise brother of Dr. Grace Devlin (Spiro). Later that year, he co-starred as Travis Alexander in Lifetime's original movie Jodi Arias: Dirty Little Secret.

In June 2013, it was reported Soffer had joined the cast of the NBC police procedural drama Chicago P.D., the first spin-off show from the drama Chicago Fire as Det. Jay Halstead. Halstead was introduced in the second season premiere of Chicago Fire. Chicago P.D. premiered on January 8, 2014. On March 19, 2014, NBC renewed the series for a second season. NBC officially announced that the second season would premiere on September 24, 2014. Soffer does his own stunts on the show.

On September 24, 2014, Soffer appeared in the second-season premiere of the YouTube comedy/talk webseries Talking Marriage with Ryan Bailey. 

On November 16, 2021, Soffer joined Will Lowery and Doug Smith on the podcqst Beyond the Fairway to discuss the similarities between acting and golf, how he got into the game, discovers Will hits cross handed, and much more!

On August 30, 2022, it was announced that season 10 of Chicago PD will be the last one for Soffer. His last appearance was on October 5, 2022, on episode 3.

On October 20, 2022, Variety announced Soffer will be back to Chicago P.D. as a director. He will direct episode 16 which is set to air in 2023. This will mark his directoral debut.

Personal life
Soffer was in a relationship with Chicago P.D. co-star Sophia Bush from May 2014 to November 2016.

Soffer began dating Chicago Med star Torrey DeVitto, officially confirming their romance in August 2018, after a year of dating. The pair announced they had ended their relationship in May 2019.

Filmography

Actor

Film

Television

Director

Awards and nominations
Daytime Emmy Award nomination, Outstanding Younger Actor in a Drama Series (2006, 2007, 2008)

References

External links

Bio at SoapCentral.com
Bio at TVGuide.com
Bio at NBC.com

1984 births
American male child actors
American male film actors
American male soap opera actors
American male television actors
The Frederick Gunn School alumni
Living people
Place of birth missing (living people)